The 2013 Open BNP Paribas Banque de Bretagne was a professional tennis tournament played on hard courts. It was the third edition of the tournament which was part of the 2013 ATP Challenger Tour. It took place in Quimper, France between 10 and 16 February 2013.

Singles main-draw entrants

Seeds

1 Rankings as of February 4, 2013.

Other entrants
The following players received wildcards into the singles main draw:
  Mathias Bourgue
  Romain Jouan
  Édouard Roger-Vasselin
  Maxime Teixeira

The following players received entry as a special exempt into the singles main draw:
  Viktor Galović
  Michał Przysiężny

The following players received entry from the qualifying draw:
  Adrien Bossel
  Riccardo Ghedin
  Henri Laaksonen
  Clément Reix

Doubles main-draw entrants

Seeds

1 Rankings as of February 4, 2013.

Other entrants
The following pairs received wildcards into the doubles main draw:
  Maxime Authom /  Charles-Antoine Brézac
  Emilien Firmin /  Gilles Müller
  Romain Jouan /  Clément Reix

Champions

Singles

 Marius Copil def.  Marc Gicquel, 7–6(11–9), 6–4

Doubles

 Johan Brunström /  Raven Klaasen def.  Jamie Delgado /  Ken Skupski, 3–6, 6–2, [10–3]

External links
Official Website

Open BNP Paribas Banque de Bretagne
Open BNP Paribas Banque de Bretagne
2013 in French tennis